Joseph G. Echols (March 23, 1917 – March 28, 1977) was an American football coach, college athletics administrator, and Negro league baseball player.

Early life and baseball career
Raised in Englewood, New Jersey, Echols played prep football at St. Cecilia High School in Englewood. In 1939, Echols played for the Newark Bears of the Negro National League.

Coaching career
Echols served as the head football coach at Morehouse College in Atlanta, Georgia from 1950 to 1954 and at Norfolk State University in Norfolk, Virginia from 1955 to 1960. The home basketball arena on Norfolk State's campus is named Joseph G. Echols Memorial Hall in his honor.

Death
Echols died at the age of 60, on March 28, 1977.

Head coaching record

References

External links
 and Seamheads

1917 births
1977 deaths
Morehouse Maroon Tigers football coaches
Newark Eagles players
Norfolk State Spartans athletic directors
Norfolk State Spartans football coaches
African-American coaches of American football
African-American college athletic directors in the United States
People from Englewood, New Jersey
Sportspeople from Bergen County, New Jersey
St. Cecilia High School (New Jersey) alumni
Coaches of American football from New Jersey
Baseball players from New Jersey
20th-century African-American sportspeople